Beautysleep is the second album by Tanya Donelly, released in 2002.

Tanya's last music video to date was "Keeping You". "The Night You Saved My Life" was also released to Triple A radio in the U.S.

"Beautysleep" peaked at #88 on the Official UK Album Charts for one week upon its release.

Track listing
All songs by Tanya Donelly, except where noted
"Life Is but a Dream" – 2:47
"The Storm" – 4:03
"The Night You Saved My Life" (Donelly, Dean Fisher) – 3:59
"Keeping You" – 4:20
"Moonbeam Monkey" – 3:47
"Wrap-Around Skirt" – 3:33
"Another Moment" – 4:33
"Darkside" (Donelly, Fisher) – 3:50
"So Much Song" – 4:38
"The Wave" (Donelly, Fisher) – 4:04
"The Shadow" (Donelly, Fisher) – 3:57
"Head for Math" - 3:48 (hidden track starts 5:57 in to "The Shadow")

Personnel 
Tanya Donelly – organ, acoustic guitar, guitar, piano, keyboards, vocals, wind, e-bow
Gracie Bee – glockenspiel
Poppy Ellard – vocals
Dean Fisher – organ, acoustic guitar, bass, drums, electric guitar, keyboards, triangle, Moog synthesizer, shaker
Rich Gilbert – organ, guitar, autoharp, electric guitar, keyboards, slide guitar
Hilken Mancini – vocals
David Narcizo – drums, tambourine
Mark Sandman – vocals
Elizabeth Steen – accordion
Chris Toppin – vocals

Production
Producers: Tanya Donelly, Matthew Ellard, Dean Fisher
Engineer: Brian Brown
Mixing: Matthew Ellard
Mastering: Bob Ludwig
Vocal arrangement: Chris Toppin
Design: Chris Bigg
Illustrations: Chris Bigg
Portraits: Dana Tynan

Tanya Donelly albums
2002 albums
4AD albums